Li Lianying: The Imperial Eunuch, also known as The Last Eunuch, is a 1991 Chinese biographical film directed by Tian Zhuangzhuang. It tells the story of Li Lianying, a eunuch who wielded power in the waning days of the Qing Dynasty. The film was entered into the 41st Berlin International Film Festival, where it won an Honourable Mention.

Cast
Jiang Wen as Li Lianying
Liu Xiaoqing as Empress Dowager Cixi
Xu Fan as Consort Zhen
Zhu Xu as Prince Chun
Tian Shaojun
Liu Bin
Ding Jiali

References

External links

Li Lianying: The Imperial Eunuch at the Chinese Movie Database

1991 films
1990s biographical drama films
Chinese biographical drama films
1990s Mandarin-language films
Films set in the Qing dynasty
Films directed by Tian Zhuangzhuang
1991 drama films